Anke Feller (born 26 September 1971 in Göttingen) is a retired German sprinter, who specialized in the 400 metres.

Her personal best time is 51.82 seconds, achieved in July 1999 in Erfurt.

Achievements

References

1971 births
Living people
German female sprinters
Sportspeople from Göttingen
World Athletics Championships medalists
European Athletics Championships medalists
World Athletics Indoor Championships medalists
World Athletics Championships winners